A Light Woman may refer to:

 A Light Woman (1920 film), an American film
 A Light Woman (1928 film), a British film starring Benita Hume